Bethel may refer to:
Bethel, Clarke County, Virginia
Bethel, Fauquier County, Virginia
Bethel, Highland County, Virginia
Bethel, Prince William County, Virginia
Bethel, Warren County, Virginia
Bethel, Washington County, Virginia
Stringtown, Wythe County, Virginia (alternate name)
West Bethel, Virginia in Amherst County
Big Bethel, Virginia in Hampton
Bethel Church, Virginia in Isle of Wight County